François Julien called Jules or Julien) Turgan (8 February 1824 – 16 February 1887) was a 19th-century French chansonnier, physician and journalist.

Biography 
Turgan studied at the collège royal de Saint-Louis where he excelled in Latin version (1838). From 1842, he was a lyricist for Émile Bienaimé and became a physician. He stood out in 1848 by his acts of devotion during the days of June and during the cholera epidemic.

A scientific editor for L'Événement then at the Le Bien-être universel, he established La Fabrique, la ferme, l'atelier (1851–1853), a popular science newspaper. Assistant manager of the Journal officiel (1852–1858), a friend of Théophile Gautier, he became director of Le Moniteur universel in 1852. He was also a resident member of the Science section of the "Comité des travaux historiques et scientifiques" (1870–1877).

Works 
1842: Les Écoliers de Paris, nocturne, music by Émile Bienaimé
1842: Vole, ma noire gondole, melody, music by Émile Bienaimé
1851: Les Ballons, histoire de la locomotion aérienne depuis son origine jusqu'à nos jours, foreword by Gérard de Nerval
1860: Orfèvrerie Christofle
1860–1868 Les Grandes usines en France, 8 vols.
1867: Études sur l'Exposition universelle
1867: L'Artillerie moderne à grande puissance, études et renseignements
1880: L'Évolution légale
1880: Le Sénégal, sa colonisation par l'enseignement populaire
1882: Les Établissements Duval

Bibliography 
 Pierre Larousse, Le Grand dictionnaire universel du XIXe siècle, vol.7, 1898, (p. 1159)
 Gustave Vapereau, Dictionnaire universel des contemporains, 1880, (p. 1777)
 Notice nécrologique de Julien Turgan, La Nature, 1887
 René Martin, La vie d'un grand journaliste, 1948, (p. 106)

References 

French chansonniers
19th-century French physicians
19th-century French journalists
French male journalists
1824 births
Writers from Paris
1887 deaths
19th-century French male writers
Physicians from Paris
Singers from Paris